WYVK (92.1 FM) is a radio station broadcasting a classic hits format.  Licensed to Middleport, Ohio, United States, the station is currently owned by Positive Radio Group, Inc. of Ohio and features programming from ABC Radio.

History
The station went on the air as WMPO-FM on 1979-05-31.  On 1999-08-02, the station changed its call sign to the current WYVK.

References

External links

YVK